The Obolonsko–Teremkivska line, is the second line of the Kyiv Metro, first opened in 1976, it extended northwards along the right bank of the Dnieper river and began deviating from the river towards the southwest. As the current stations were built in the 1970s and 1980s, architecturally the line shows some of the best examples of late-Soviet architectural features. It is generally coloured blue on the maps.

Stations 
 Heroiv Dnipra
 Minska
 Obolon
 Pochaina
 Tarasa Shevchenka
 Kontraktova Ploshcha
 Poshtova Ploshcha
 Maidan Nezalezhnosti → Khreshchatyk 
 Ploshcha Lva Tolstoho → Palats Sportu 
 Olimpiiska
 Palats "Ukrayina"
 Lybidska
 Demiivska
 Holosiivska
 Vasylkivska
 Vystavkovyi Tsentr
 Ipodrom
 Teremky

Timeline

Name changes

Until February 2018 the metro line was named Kurenivsko-Chervonoarmiyska.

Transfers

Rolling stock
The line is served by the Obolon' (#2) depot. Presently 32 five-carriage trains are assigned to it. Most of them are of type 81-717/714 and 81-717.5/714.5 built during the late 1970s and the 1980s.
In 2007 new type 81-540.2K/541.2K, which is an advancement of type 81-717/714, went into service on the line. In 2002 a train of type 81-553.1/554.1/555.1 (Slavutich), which is a variant of the
81-71M in Prague metro, went into service on the line and it's the only train in the entire Kyiv metro.

Recent developments and future plans
A major extension of the line to the southwestern regions of Holosiiv and Teremky has long been planned since the 1980s, however due to the difficult conditions under the Lybid River and financial shortages, all work was frozen in the early 1990s and the completed sections were flooded.

Resumed in 2002, the project will conclude of seven stations and were finished by 2020. Demiyivska, Holosiivska and Vasylkivska were opened 15 December 2010; after a delay of two years because of lack of funds. Vystakovyi Tsentr was opened 27 December 2011. The second stage included the stations Ipodrom and Teremky which brought the line along the Akademika Glushkova avenue past the Kyiv Ring Road. Initially planned opening for these two was foreseen for 2012; but Ipodrom was opened on 25 October 2012 and Teremky was opened on 6 November 2013.

The final stage may finish with the station Odeska and a new depot nearby. A considered option is a two station branch after Ipodrom northwards to two further stations: Avtovokzal Teremky and Vulytsia Kreisera Avrory.

References

External links

  Obolonsko–Teremkivska line, Kyiv Metro official site

Kyiv Metro lines
Railway lines opened in 1976
1976 establishments in Ukraine